The following is a list of Nippon Professional Baseball players with the last name starting with G, retired or active.

G

References

External links
Japanese Baseball

 G